Philothamnus is a genus of snakes in the family Colubridae. The genus is endemic to Sub-Saharan Africa.

Species
The following 24 species are recognized as being valid.
Philothamnus angolensis 
Philothamnus battersbyi 
Philothamnus belli 
Philothamnus bequaerti 
Philothamnus brunneus 
Philothamnus carinatus 
Philothamnus dorsalis 
Philothamnus girardi 
Philothamnus heterodermus 
Philothamnus heterolepidotus 
Philothamnus hoplogaster 
Philothamnus hughesi 
Philothamnus irregularis 
Philothamnus macrops 
Philothamnus mayombensis 
Philothamnus natalensis 
Philothamnus nitidus 
Philothamnus occidentalis 
Philothamnus ornatus 
Philothamnus pobeguini 
Philothamnus punctatus 
Philothamnus ruandae 
Philothamnus semivariegatus 
Philothamnus thomensis 

Nota bene: A binomial authority in parentheses indicates that the species was originally described in a genus other than Philothamnus.

References

Philothamnus
Snake genera